Dales United Reformed Church was built as Parkdale Congregational Church on Parkdale Road in Bakersfield Nottingham in 1930.

History

The church opened in 1930 as Parkdale Congregational Church. It was one of three planned in the 1920s and 1930s by the Nottinghamshire Congregational Churches Extension Committee, to serve new housing estates around Nottingham. The other two were Sherwood and Lenton Abbey.

It was built to serve Bakersfield, Nottingham. In common with most Congregational churches in the 1970s, it joined the United Reformed Church. In 1986 the church joined with Albion Congregational Church and renamed itself Dales United Reformed Church.

References

Churches completed in 1930
United Reformed churches in Nottingham
Congregational churches in Nottingham
1930 establishments in England